Sir Maurice Berkeley (1599–1654) was an English politician who sat in the House of Commons at various times between 1621 and 1626. He supported the Royalist cause in the English Civil War. Berkeley was the son of Richard Berkeley of Stoke Gifford and Rendcomb, Gloucestershire who was Member of Parliament for Gloucestershire in 1614. 

In 1621, Berkeley was elected Member of Parliament for Gloucestershire. He was knighted on 11 September 1621 at Whitehall. He was re-elected MP for Gloucestershire at by-elections in 1624 and 1625 and was elected MP for Great Bedwyn in 1626.

Berkeley supported King Charles I in the Civil War, arguing later that he was forced to do so and to sign warrants for raising money because of his proximity to Bristol. On 26 January 1647, he begged to compound for delinquency and was set a fine of £1,030 on 25 March. He was assessed at £700 on 13 June 1649 and was given an order for his discharge on payment of £330 on 1 August 1649. He was given a similar order on payment of £60 on 5 December 1651 and was charged an additional fine on 30 January 1652 and given an order for his discharge on payment of £125.  
 
Berkeley died in 1654 and was buried at Stoke Gifford on 3 January 1655.

Berkeley married firstly Elizabeth Coke, daughter of Sir Edward Coke of Stoke Poges, and secondly Mary Tipping, daughter of Sir George Tipping of Wheatfield, Oxfordshire.

References

 

1599 births
1654 deaths
Politicians from Gloucestershire
Cavaliers
English MPs 1621–1622
English MPs 1624–1625
English MPs 1625
English MPs 1626